Alex Debón Latorre (born 1 March 1976 in La Vall d'Uixó, Valencia, Spain) is a former professional motorcycle road racer, who last competed in the Moto2 World Championship.

Career

He began racing internationally in 2000 after a handful of wildcard rides, but after several years of middling results he became Aprilia's test and reserve rider in 2006. He was promoted to a regular race ride for 2008, after some strong wildcard showings including Catalunya in 2006 and Brno in 2007.

Debón opened the season with a pole position in Qatar, leading on the final lap before dropping to fourth. He took his first GP win on 18 May 2008 at Le Mans in the French Grand Prix. Having qualified on pole, he correctly chose dry tyres in changeable conditions, and pulled away to a huge lead - resulting in speculation that his bike may contain traction control, in preparation for Aprilia's planned MotoGP class bike. It was the 112th GP start of his career.

For 2010 he raced for Ajo Motorsport in Moto2, with a chassis by FTR Moto. He finished second in the first race in Qatar. At Assen, he crashed heavily in qualifying, breaking his collarbone having set the third-quickest time in the session. During the season, Debón announced his intention to retire at the end of the season, and will be replaced by Kevin Coghlan for the  season.

Career statistics

Grand Prix motorcycle racing

By season

Races by year
(key) (Races in bold indicate pole position, races in italics indicate fastest lap)

References

External links

1976 births
Living people
People from La Vall d'Uixó
Sportspeople from the Province of Castellón
Spanish motorcycle racers
250cc World Championship riders
Moto2 World Championship riders